Pashko is a surname. Notable people with the surname include:

Gramoz Pashko (1955–2006), Albanian economist and politician
Josif Pashko (1918–1963), Albanian politician
Walter Pashko (1930–2006), American painter

See also 
Pasco (disambiguation)
Pasko (disambiguation)